Andrew Perry (born 28 December 1962) is an English former professional footballer. He made a total of 17 appearances in The Football League for Portsmouth and Gillingham.

References

1962 births
English Football League players
English footballers
Portsmouth F.C. players
Gillingham F.C. players
Living people
Footballers from Dulwich
Association football midfielders
20th-century English people